11 Commando was an infantry training battalion of the South African Army Infantry Formation Corps.

Origin
11 Commando was formed at Kimberly around November 1973. The majority of the Danie Theron Combat School training/recruit wing staff were transferred to this unit.

The majority of the recruits were area bound farmers, business owners, or essentials services).

These recruits were to be allocated to regional commandos after their initial training.

Relationship with Intelligence
When 11 Commando closed down The Intelligence School took control of the facility and continued to use 11 Commando's insignia.

In September 1982, SA Intelligence School Took over from 11 Commando. The unit flash with the red Chief of Army Higher Formation bar was introduced thereafter. In December 1988 SA Intelligence School moved to Potchefstroom. From January 1989 the C Army reporting line was changed to the regional Command reporting structure, so the School fell under North West Command from 1989, until the SADF was replaced by the SANDF in 1994, after which the regional Command system fell away and was replaced by a new Army structure, based on Formations.

Commanding Officers
Commandant W.S. van der Waals 1973
Commandant A.K. de Lager 1974
Commandant R, van Rensburg 1977

Insignia
11 Commando retained the standard commando beret badge

References

See also 
 South African Commando System

Infantry regiments of South Africa
Military units and formations established in 1973
Military units and formations of South Africa in the Border War
Military units and formations of South Africa
South African Commando Units
Military units and formations disestablished in 1982